Tiedemannia filiformis (syn. Oxypolis filiformis) is a species of flowering plant in the carrot family known by the common names water cowbane and water dropwort. It grows in swamps, freshwater wetlands, and along the borders of ponds in the southeastern United States, as far north as Delaware, as well as the northern Bahamian pineyards of the Bahamas.

References

filiformis
Flora of the Southeastern United States
Flora of the Bahamas
Plants described in 1788
Plants described in 2012